The 2014 Irwin Tools Night Race was a NASCAR Sprint Cup Series stock car race that was held on August 23, 2014, at Bristol Motor Speedway in Bristol, Tennessee. Contested over 500 laps, it was the 24th race of the 2014 NASCAR Sprint Cup Series. Joey Logano of Team Penske took his third win of the season. Logano's teammate Brad Keselowski finished second while Matt Kenseth, Jimmie Johnson, and Kurt Busch completed the top five placings. The top rookies of the race were Kyle Larson (12th), Justin Allgaier (19th), and Austin Dillon (28th). This would also be the final race for veteran NASCAR driver, Jeff Burton.

Previous week's race
Jeff Gordon took the lead from Joey Logano at the final restart and went on to win for the 91st time in his career, in the Pure Michigan 400 at Michigan International Speedway. Gordon stated that he had "got a really good restart, and I got to his quarter panel in Turn 1 and I was able to drag him back and it allowed me to get the momentum and get by him". Logano felt he had Gordon cleared and lamented that he "should have pulled down in front of him".

Report

Background

The track's turns are banked from twenty-four to thirty degrees, while the front stretch, the location of the finish line, is banked from six to ten degrees. The back stretch also has banking from six to ten degrees. The track has a seating capacity of 160,000 people. The defending race winner was Matt Kenseth.

Tony Stewart was on the entry list for the weekend's race, but following the events that took place at Canandaigua Motorsports Park, it was unknown if he'd be in the car. On Wednesday, August 20, Stewart-Haas Racing released a statement that Stewart would sit out again and Jeff Burton would drive in his place. The team would continue to evaluate the drive on a week-by-week basis.

Ryan Truex was cleared to race at Bristol after missing the previous week's race at Michigan. He suffered a concussion in a single car crash during the second practice session and J. J. Yeley drove in his place. Truex stated that he was "happy to be back to it this weekend" on Twitter.

Entry list
The entry list for the Irwin Tools Night Race was released on Monday, August 18, 2014 at 11:05 a.m. Eastern time. Forty-three drivers were entered for the race.

Practice

First practice
David Gilliland hit the wall as a result of a stuck throttle; he was forced to switch to a backup car as a result.

Final practice

Qualifying
Harvick saw his qualifying position as an advantage, as he deemed that "track position is definitely as important as it is anywhere here with the current groove and where you are running" and also "felt good about our car during practice and just have to stay in there all night and do the best we can". Jeff Gordon joined Harvick on the front row, and stated that he "thought our car was a little bit better in race trim than it was in qualifying trim when we swapped over", and also stated that the conditions of the track were very tricky. Aric Almirola, Kyle Larson and Cole Whitt hit the wall during qualifying, with Almirola lamenting the fact and stating he had "probably the best race car I've ever had at Bristol and I screwed up and hit the fence".

Qualifying results

Race

First half

Start

The race was scheduled to start at 7:46 p.m. Eastern time but started three minutes late when Kevin Harvick led the field to the green. Harvick led the race until lap 38 when Jeff Gordon took the lead. He led until lap 55 when Kyle Busch assumed the lead of the race, and held it to the first caution of the race; at lap 61, there was a competition caution that had been scheduled due to overnight rain showers around the vicinity of the circuit. Harvick retook the lead during the caution period; Kyle Busch came off pit road as the leader, but he was sent to the rear of the field for speeding in the pits and Matt Kenseth assumed the lead for the restart on lap 68.

Calamity
The caution came out a lap later for a multi-car crash in turn 2, before the race restarted on lap 77. Kenseth maintained the lead of the race, for a good portion of the race; he was not headed until Joey Logano took the lead on lap 104. The caution flew for the third time on lap 125 for a multi-car wreck on the backstretch that began when Brian Vickers got into Kyle Larson, and then spun into Aric Almirola. Clint Bowyer then ran into Kyle Busch, sending Busch spinning into the inside wall. Denny Hamlin took the lead during the caution period, and held the lead as the race restarted on lap 137.

Tempers flare

While racing for the lead, Harvick tapped Hamlin, which sent him spinning into the inside wall on the front stretch. Hamlin's car bounced off the wall, and back up towards the track where it hit the left-hand side of the car of Dale Earnhardt Jr., ripping all the protection foam out of it. This brought out the fourth caution of the race on lap 161; Hamlin subsequently threw his HANS device at Harvick's car. This was the second straight year that the two drivers had a post-crash altercation during the summer Bristol race. Post-race, Harvick described the incident as "I just lost the front end, honestly", apportioning blame on himself. Hamlin was angered at the way his race ended, which left him with a 40th-place finish. Earnhardt Jr. tried to avoid a collision with Hamlin's car, but as he described it, "there was a lot of smoke so I couldn't really judge the speed of his car to know whether I needed to be going up there and go around him on the top". The damage to his car – the lower control arm was torn off his left-front tire – left him with a 39th-place finish.

The race restarted on lap 173 with Harvick leading the way. Harvick held the lead until the fifth caution of the race, which flew on lap 195, after Michael Annett hit the wall in turn 4. Kasey Kahne took the lead after staying out when the leaders pitted, and led the field to the restart on lap 201. Kahne led the next portion of the race, before Jamie McMurray took over at the front on lap 238. McMurray led until the caution flew for the sixth time on lap 264, after Danica Patrick got spun out by Alex Bowman in turn 2. Bowman referred to the incident as looking "like somebody slid up a couple of cars in front of her and they all checked up", and added that he spoke to Patrick post-race about the incident – this occurred after Patrick ran up on Bowman to show her displeasure, after the incident. Patrick stated that her and Bowman had made up but stated that if the two came into contact on the track again, "worse things will happen". Brad Keselowski took the lead during the pit cycle, and held the race lead for the restart on lap 270. Keselowski maintained the race beyond the 300-lap mark, and until lap 312, when McMurray assumed the lead once again. McMurray held the lead for almost 50 laps before the caution flag flew for the seventh time during the race; this was caused by debris on the track. McMurray won the race off pit road, despite Logano momentarily taking the lead through the pit process.

Second half

The race restarted on lap 367, with McMurray in the lead. It was a short-lived restart, as the caution came out for the eighth time on lap 375 after Marcos Ambrose crashed on the front stretch. McMurray again led to the restart, on lap 382. A 50-lap green-flag period followed, before the ninth and final caution of the race – on lap 431 – for debris. Logano and Matt Kenseth both led a lap during the caution period, before the restart on lap 438. Kyle Busch had been complaining late in the race about his car; he stated over his car's radio that "I need a whole new right front suspension, a whole new right front suspension". In light of his driver's complaints, crew chief Dave Rogers had no sympathy for him: "Park it behind the truck and take your whiny little ass to the bus". Busch recorded a 36th-place finish, after leading eight laps earlier in the race. Rogers deemed the race as "frustrating", and also stated that he and Busch spoke after the race following the communications over the radio, and "had a great talk". Team owner Joe Gibbs said Busch and Rogers cleared the air before they left the track, after "a frustrating night", but Gibbs was "kind of used to it". Logano took the lead with 45 laps to go and had to hold off a late race charge by Penske teammate Keselowski to score his third win of the 2014 season. Logano described the result as "awesome", and also reflected on his personal best 2014 campaign. Keselowski praised Logano's performance, stating that "he ran a great race" while his car "was just about equal to Joey's but he just had better track position than on us".

Race results

Race statistics
 16 lead changes among different drivers
 9 cautions for 64 laps
 Time of race: 2:52:00
 Joey Logano won his first race at Bristol

Media

Television

Radio

Standings after the race

Drivers' Championship standings

Manufacturers' Championship standings

Note: Only the first sixteen positions are included for the driver standings.

Note

References

Irwin Tools Night Race
Irwin Tools Night Race
NASCAR races at Bristol Motor Speedway
Irwin Tools Night Race